La Rue sans nom is a novel by Marcel Aymé, published in June 1930. It was adapted into a film in 1934 by Pierre Chenal.

Plot
The story focuses on a street in the Parisian banlieue where Italian and French workers reside. Their neighborhood will soon be demolished, but a mysterious character hides himself in this street.

The main themes are xenophobia, poverty, the importance of alcohol, love, madness and aging.

Film adaptation
Street Without a Name (2 February 1934), directed by Pierre Chenal

Notes and references

Novels by Marcel Aymé
1930 French novels
Novels set in Paris
French novels adapted into films